Vulsirea nigrorubra is a species of stink bug in the family Pentatomidae. It is found in the Caribbean.

References

Further reading

 
 
 
 
 
 
 
 

Insects described in 1837
Pentatomini